Spencerville Adventist Academy is a Seventh-day Adventist full K-12 day academy located in Spencerville, Montgomery County, Maryland. 
It is a part of the Seventh-day Adventist education system, the world's second largest Christian school system. Its first year began in 1943 with six students and has grown to its present enrollment of over three hundred. Spencerville Adventist Academy has just opened its newly constructed facility on the outskirts of Burtonsville Maryland. They offer Pre-K through 12th grade college preparatory education. The school is open to all faiths but generally gives first right to enroll to students from Seventh-Day Adventist churches. They are also one of the first LEED certified schools in Montgomery County.

History

The Spencerville Seventh-day Adventist Church was officially organized December 27, 1941. For the first decade, the church focused on the building and further upgrading of a school. In September 1943, the Spencerville church school opened for the first time with six children from three families. In mid September 1948, the church established a separate structure for the school. This building of the school delayed the building of a permanent church structure until 1951. As time went by the members realized that it had been wise to focus on the school first. Along with an increase in school enrollment the church membership also increased.

In 1995, planning began for significant development of what was then Spencerville Junior Academy. Soon after this, the school became a senior academy with an enrollment over 300 from K-12. In 2003, the church purchased property for a new facility and the groundbreaking ceremony took place April 19, 2009.

Academics
The required curriculum includes classes in the following subject areas: Religion, English, Oral Communications, Social Studies, Mathematics, Science, Physical Education, Health, Computer Applications, Fine Arts, and Electives.

Spiritual aspects
All students take religion classes each year that they are enrolled. These classes cover topics in biblical history and Christian and denominational doctrines. Instructors in other disciplines also begin each class period with prayer or a short devotional thought, many which encourage student input. Weekly, the entire student body gathers together in the auditorium for an hour-long chapel service.
Outside the classrooms there is year-round spiritually oriented programming that relies on student involvement.

See also

 List of Seventh-day Adventist secondary schools
 Seventh-day Adventist education

References

External links
 

Educational institutions established in 1943
Private high schools in Maryland
Adventist secondary schools in the United States
Schools in Montgomery County, Maryland
Private middle schools in Maryland
Private elementary schools in Maryland
1943 establishments in Maryland